The Staatsgalerie Aschaffenburg ("State Gallery Aschaffenburg") is an art museum in Schloss Johannisburg in Aschaffenburg, Germany. With some 368 paintings, it is the largest of the galleries outside Munich making up the Bavarian State Painting Collections.

The origin and main part of the museum is the collection of Friedrich Karl Joseph von Erthal, Elector of Mainz, who lived in Johannisburg from 1792 until his death in 1802. The focus lies on German and Netherlandic paintings, mainly genre paintings.

Selection of works
Abraham Bloemaert, The preaching of John the Baptist
Follower of Adriaen Brouwer, Farmers at the fire
Aert de Gelder, Passion

Notes

Art museums and galleries in Germany
Museums in Bavaria